The Public Register of All Arms and Bearings in Scotland, established in 1672, is an official register of Scottish coats of arms maintained by the Lyon Clerk and Keeper of the Records. As a public register, it can be seen by anyone on application, and on payment of a statutory fee.

History
The Register was established by Act of the Scottish Parliament in 1672. It is held at the Court of the Lord Lyon, and contains every grant of arms by Lord Lyon King of Arms since that date, as well as older coats of arms that the owners have chosen to register. Bearings that are not matriculated in the Register may not be used in Scotland, unless it can be proved that they were in use before 1672.

The first volume of the Register (now divided into two parts for ease of handling and conservation reasons) continued in use from 1672 until 1804, and contains 2,702 entries. It begins with the arms of the Lyon Office, followed by the personal achievement of Sir Charles Erskine, Bt, who was Lord Lyon  at the time. Most of the arms in this volume are given in blazon only: relatively few are painted.

From the beginning of the second volume in 1804 the arms are consistently painted. The Register now consists of over eighty volumes of parchment, and is illustrated by a succession of the most prominent heraldic artists working in Scotland.

Published ordinaries
In 1893, Sir James Balfour Paul, Lord Lyon King of Arms, published the contents of the first twelve volumes of the Register, to that date, in the form of an ordinary (i.e. with the entries in blazon, rearranged by design; and with a name index): the work contained roughly 5,200 entries. Ten years later, by which time the Register had reached its sixteenth volume, he published an updated second edition including all arms registered to the end of 1901: this edition contained 5,532 entries. By 1973 the Register had reached its 57th volume, and in 1977 Lyon Office published a second volume of the Ordinary: this covered all arms registered from 1902 to the end of 1973, and contained a further 6,040 entries. This volume was edited by David Reid of Robertland, Carrick Pursuivant (who died in December 1973, while the work was in progress), and Vivien Wilson.

The three published volumes are therefore:

Digitisation
The Register down to 1913 has been digitised, and is available on the ScotlandsPeople Website (maintained by the National Records of Scotland). Searching the index is free, but there is a fee to view the page images.

See also
Heraldry
The Court of the Lord Lyon
Lyon Clerk and Keeper of the Records
The Heraldry Society of Scotland

References

Further reading

External links
 Public Register of Arms on the National Records of Scotland website
 Coats of arms on the ScotlandsPeople website
 The Court of the Lord Lyon

1672 establishments in Scotland
17th century in Scotland
Scottish heraldry
Public records
Heritage registers in Scotland